Choi Young-jae (born 17 September 1996), professionally known by the mononym Youngjae, is a South Korean singer-songwriter and actor. He is the main vocalist of the Korean boy group Got7.

Biography 
Choi started dreaming of becoming a singer in his childhood, when he sang with his older brother. When the latter enlisted in the military, he joined a practical music academy in his hometown, Mokpo, to learn more professionally, working part-time to earn the necessary money. In 2011, he won the Vocal Excellence Award at Mokpo Youth Music Festival. In 2013, JYP Entertainment held a closed audition in the academy and he became a trainee.

Career

2013–2020: Debut and solo activities
After one month of training in Seoul, Choi was added to the project group to form JYPE new boy band. After a total of 7 months of training, he subsequently debuted as the main vocalist of the seven member boy group, Got7, with the single "Girls Girls Girls", released on 16 January 2014, from the group's first EP Got It?. In early times after the debut, Choi mentioned his dream was to become a music therapist.

He has been writing songs and lyrics under the name Ars since 2016, starting with "Rewind" in Got7's extended play Flight Log: Departure.

Choi had a collaboration with Sanjoy and Elliott Yamin in 2017 on the song "Victim of Love", while he recorded "I'm All Ears" with Park Ji-min for the Life Insurance Social Philanthropy Foundation's youth suicide prevention campaign in 2018. The song was released on 15 October alongside its music video.

In the spring of 2019, he joined Jus2 in their 'Focus' Premiere Showcase in Asia, acting as the MC for Tokyo (10–11 April) and Osaka (17–18 April) stops.

In 2018 and 2020, he sang "At the Usual Time" (그 시간에) and "Fall In Love" (빠져드나봐) for the original soundtracks of TV dramas Wok of Love and When My Love Blooms. Together with Day6's Young K, he became the new DJ of MBC Radio Idol Radio starting from 18 May 2020. The first season of the show ended on 25 September.

On 25 May 2020, in collaboration with Howlpot, a pet product design brand, he launched Ars X Coco, a clothing store for people and dogs, which ran for two weeks until 8 June . The proceeds, amounting to 15 million won, were donated to Korea Animal Rights Advocates's The Bom Center, a non-profit care center for abandoned dogs. In the same year, Choi competed in the Idol Star Dog Championships, a dog agility competition, which aired as a Chuseok special on MBC on 2 October.

On 25 September 2020, he was cast in Netflix's new sitcom So Not Worth It, which tells the stories of a group of multicultural students living in a college dorm. The series became available on 18 June 2021, and he sang the homonymous OST for it. With his portrayal of Sam, the son of the CEO of a food chain based in Australia, he drew attention, and was praised for his acting, communication skills, vocalization and pronunciation, which, along with Choi's facial expressions, realistically expressed the character's emotions.

2021–present: Departure from JYPE, Midnight Sun and solo debut
Following the expiration of his contract with JYP Entertainment, he signed an exclusive contract with Sublime Artist Agency on 20 January 2021.

On 9 March 2021, it was announced that Choi had joined the cast of Midnight Sun, a musical adaptation of Japanese movie A Song to the Sun, in the leading role of Ha-ram. Midnight Sun was performed from 1 May until 25 July at the Kwanglim Arts Center. He starred in 22 out of 95 shows. Two of the songs, "Meet Me When the Sun Goes Down" and "Good-bye Days", were also released as singles by each main actor: Choi's version of "Meet Me When the Sun Goes Down" was released on 9 April as part 1 of the musical's soundtrack, while his collaboration with Lovelyz' Kei on "Good-bye Days", on 7 June.

On 1 April, it was confirmed that Choi was selected as campaign artist for Levi's Red alongside Lim Na-young. On 20 April, he took part in Levi's 501® Day Music Concert, where he performed self-written song "Lonely", Sole's "Ride" and Christopher's "Bad".

On 7 May, he released the soundtrack "Pop Star" for the web series So I Married the Anti-fan.

On 5 October, he made his solo debut with his first extended play, Colors from Ars, and its title track "Vibin". Six days later, he released a fall-winter clothes collection in collaboration with Korean casual brand Plac. He then performed at K-pop cheering concert, We All Are One 2021 to overcome COVID-19 on 31 October.

In November, he was confirmed to play his first lead role, Kim Seung-hyu, in the upcoming Cine de Rama rom-com web series Love & Wish, based on the webtoon of the same name. Love & Wish was released through domestic and overseas OTT platforms between December 24 and 25 along with the original soundtrack, for which Choi sang "Day by Day".

On 15 December, he released the digital single "Walk With Me".

On 21 June 2022, he released his second extended play, Sugar, which debuted at #5 on the Circle Chart. Between 23 July and 7 August, Choi held the Sugar mini concert tour in Manila, Singapore and Bangkok. On 6 August 2022, he was awarded the Best Asia Artist and Actor Award at Ganesha Awards, as well as being appointed Ambassador of Cultural Friendship and Tourism Promotion to ASEAN.

In October 2022, as part of a collaborative project with Esquire Korea and casual fashion brand Covernat, Choi and Yerin released the digital single "Colors". Part of the profits was donated to patients of Lou Gehrig's disease.

On 12 March 2023 he released the digital single "Errr Day".

Personal life 
Choi studied shipbuilding machinery at Mokpo Technical High School, then, in 2012, he moved to Seoul's Korean Arts High School, from which he graduated in February 2015. He got accepted into Seokyeong University's Department of Theater and Film, then he moved to and graduated from International Cyber University. As of 2021, he's enrolled at Hanyang Cyber Graduate School.

In August 2020, he registered as an organ donor. In May 2021, he participated in the "I Rose You" campaign planned by the Love Organ Donation Movement Headquarters to promote organ donation, and to express gratitude, respect and condolences to organ donors and their families.

Discography

Extended plays

Singles

Writing credits 
All song credits are adapted from the Korea Music Copyright Association's database, unless otherwise noted.

Filmography

Dramas

Variety shows

Radio presenting

Theater

Music videos

Awards and nominations

References

External links

 
 

Living people
JYP Entertainment artists
South Korean male singers
1996 births
Got7 members
South Korean male idols
South Korean pop singers